Get Married can refer to any of the following:
Marriage
Get Married (TV series), an American TV series on Lifetime Television
Get Married (film), a 2007 Indonesian film by Hanung Bramantyo